"Oh! Carol" is an international hit written by Neil Sedaka in 1958. Co-written with Howard Greenfield, the song is noted for Sedaka's spoken recitation of the verse, the second time around.

The song spent 18 weeks on the Billboard Hot 100, reaching No. 9 on December 6, 1959, while reaching #3 on the UK's New Musical Express chart. It also earned Sedaka his first #1 ranking when it went to #1 in the Netherlands and Wallonia. After its release as a single, it was included in the album Neil Sedaka Sings Little Devil and His Other Hits. 

At the time Sedaka produced the record, his second and third singles, "I Go Ape" and "Crying My Heart Out for You" had fared poorly on the charts, and RCA Victor was ready to drop him from their label, but producer Al Nevins persuaded the RCA executives to give Sedaka one last chance. Determined to create a hit song, Sedaka purchased the three top singles of the day and listened to them repeatedly, studying their melody, chord progression, and lyrical styles; and he found that they were very similar in structure. He then used this knowledge to create the song, "Oh! Carol".

"Carol" was a reference to Carol Klein, Sedaka's ex-girlfriend from high school and a fellow songwriter at the Brill Building. She had since married Gerry Goffin, who took the tune, and wrote the playful response "Oh! Neil", which she recorded and released as an unsuccessful single the same year (1959) under the stage name Carole King.

Sedaka also recorded a Hebrew-language version of "Oh! Carol"' which was written by Chaim Kaynan. It has been covered by other artists in other languages as well.

The B-side song, "One Way Ticket", also earned Sedaka a #1 ranking in Japan for several months in 1960, where it was affectionately known as "The Choo-Choo Train Song".

Chart performance

Other recorded versions
The Four Seasons (in their album Sherry & 11 Others) (1962)
General Saint featuring Don Campbell (a minor UK hit at #54) (1994)

References

1958 songs
1959 singles
Hep Stars songs
Neil Sedaka songs
RCA Victor singles
Songs written by Neil Sedaka
Songs with lyrics by Howard Greenfield
Ultratop 50 Singles (Wallonia) number-one singles